Cocke County is a county on the eastern border of the U.S. state of Tennessee. As of the 2020 census, the population was 35,999. Its county seat is Newport. Cocke County comprises the Newport, TN Micropolitan Statistical Area, which is part of the Knoxville-Morristown-Sevierville, Tennessee Combined Statistical Area.

History
Before the arrival of European settlers, the area that is now Cocke County probably was inhabited by the Cherokee. They were the most recent of a series of indigenous cultures who had occupied this country for thousands of years.

The first recorded European settlement in the county was in 1783 when land near the fork of the French Broad and the Pigeon Rivers was cleared and cultivated. The earliest European settlers were primarily Scots-Irish, Dutch, and Germans who came to the area over the mountains from the Carolinas or through Virginia from Pennsylvania and other northern states.

The county was established by an Act of the Tennessee General Assembly on October 9, 1797, from a part of Greene County, Tennessee. It was named after  William Cocke, one of the state's first Senators. Located within the Appalachian and Great Smoky Mountains, it had difficult conditions for early settlers.

Like many East Tennessee counties, settled by yeomen farmers, Cocke County was largely pro-Union on the eve of the Civil War. In Tennessee's Ordinance of Secession referendum on June 8, 1861, the county's residents voted 1,185 to 518 against secession.

Geography

The southern part of the county is located within the Great Smoky Mountains, and the lands are protected by the Great Smoky Mountains National Park. The northern part of the county is situated within the Ridge-and-Valley Appalachians.

Cocke County is drained by the French Broad River, which traverses the northern part of the county and forms much of its boundary with Jefferson County. A portion of this river is part of Douglas Lake, an artificial reservoir created by Douglas Dam further downstream.  The Pigeon River flows northward across the county and empties into the French Broad north of Newport at Irish Bottoms.

Adjacent counties
Hamblen County (north)
Greene County (northeast)
Madison County, North Carolina (east)
Haywood County, North Carolina (south)
Sevier County (southwest)
Jefferson County (northwest)

National protected areas
 Appalachian Trail (part)
 Cherokee National Forest (part)
 Foothills Parkway (part)
 Great Smoky Mountains National Park (part)

State protected areas
Rankin Wildlife Management Area (part)
Martha Sundquist State Forest

Major highways

 SR 73

Demographics

2020 census

As of the 2020 United States census, there were 35,999 people, 14,060 households, and 9,196 families residing in the county.

2000 census
As of the census of 2000, 33,565 people, 13,762 households, and 9,715 families were residing in the county.  The population density was 77 people per square mile (30/km2).  The 15,844 housing units averaged 36 per mi2(14/km2).  The racial makeup of the county was 96.16% White, 1.99% African American, 0.40% Native American, 0.15% Asian,  0.33% from other races, and 0.96% from two or more races. About 1.05% of the population was Hispanic or Latino of any race.

Of the 13,762 households, 29.50% had children under the age of 18 living with them, 53.10% were married couples living together, 13.00% had a female householder with no husband present, and 29.40% were not families. About 25.70% of all households were made up of individuals, and 10.10% had someone living alone who was 65 years of age or older.  The average household size was 2.41 and the average family size was 2.87.

In the county, the population was distributed as 22.80% under the age of 18, 8.30% from 18 to 24, 28.80% from 25 to 44, 26.40% from 45 to 64, and 13.60% who were 65 years of age or older.  The median age was 39 years. For every 100 females, there were 94.60 males.  For every 100 females age 18 and over, there were 92.80 males.

The median income for a household in the county was $25,553, and for a family was $30,418. Males had a median income of $26,062 versus $18,826 for females. The per capita income for the county was $13,881.  About 18.70% of families and 22.50% of the population were below the poverty line, including 31.80% of those under age 18 and 18.70% of those age 65 or over.

Communities

City
Newport, county seat

Town and Census Designated Place
Parrottsville
Cosby

Unincorporated communities

 Allen Grove
 Baltimore
 Boomer
 Briar Thicket
 Bridgeport
 Bybee
 Cosby
 Del Rio
 Hartford
 Liberty Hill
 Midway
 Tom Town
 Wasp

Notable residents
Ben W. Hooper, governor of Tennessee from 1911 to 1915
Popcorn Sutton, moonshiner
Marshall Teague, actor

In popular culture

The novel Christy and the television series of the same name are based on historical events, people, and localities of Cocke County. The fictional small town of El Pano, where the novel begins, is based on the existing village of Del Rio, Tennessee. The fictional Cutter Gap, where most of the plot unfolds, represents the locale now known as Chapel Hollow.

Politics

Like all of Unionist East Tennessee, Cocke County has been overwhelmingly Republican ever since the Civil War. Since the first postwar election in 1868, Cocke County has voted for every Republican presidential candidate, even supporting William Howard Taft during the divided 1912 election. No Democratic presidential candidate has managed to receive forty percent of the county's vote in this time, although Franklin D. Roosevelt in his 1932 landslide got within 0.23 percent of this figure.

See also
National Register of Historic Places listings in Cocke County, Tennessee

References

Further reading
 Goodspeed Publishing Company, "History of Cocke County", pages 864–867 in History of Tennessee, 1887. Retrieved November 26, 2006.
 Walker, E.R. III. Cocke County, Tennessee: Pages from the Past. Charleston: The History Press (2007).

External links

 Official site 
 Cocke County Partnership – Chamber of Commerce
 Cocke County Schools
 Cocke County, TNGenWeb – genealogy resources 
 

 
1797 establishments in Tennessee
Populated places established in 1797
Counties of Appalachia
Second Amendment sanctuaries in Tennessee
East Tennessee